The 2023 season will be the San Francisco 49ers' upcoming 74th in the National Football League, their 78th overall, their tenth playing their home games at Levi's Stadium and their seventh under the head coach/general manager tandem of Kyle Shanahan and John Lynch. They will look to improve upon their 13-4 record from the previous year and win the NFC West for the second consecutive season. This will be the first season since 2016 to not include quarterback Jimmy Garoppolo on the roster, as he signed with the Las Vegas Raiders.

Offseason

Roster changes

Free agency
The 49ers entered free agency with the following:

Signings

Draft

Notes

Staff

Current roster

Preseason
The 49ers' preseason opponents and schedule will be announced in the spring.

Regular season

2023 opponents
Listed below are the 49ers' opponents for 2023. Exact dates and times will be announced in the spring.

References

External links
 

San Francisco
San Francisco 49ers seasons
San Francisco 49ers